At the 1900 Summer Olympics, an association football tournament was contested for the first time. Only two matches were held between the three club sides, and no medals were awarded.

France's representatives were determined by the USFSA, which elected the Parisian champion Club Français. For Belgium, after Racing Club de Bruxelles declined to participate, a student selection with players from the Université libre de Bruxelles was sent by the Federation. The team was reinforced with a few non-students. On the other hand, English club Upton Park F.C. represented Great Britain.

The International Olympic Committee credits Great Britain, France and a "Mixed Team" with gold, silver and bronze medals, respectively, as part of its attempt to reconcile early Olympic Games with the modern award scheme. The Belgian team included one British and one Dutch player.

The football matches were held at the Vélodrome de Vincennes in Paris.

Competition schedule
The match schedule of the tournament.

Venue

Squads

Matches 
In the first game, the British squad had little difficulty defeating the USFSA XI. Upton Park led 2–0 after the first half, getting two more goals in the second to win 4–0. Gaston Peltier scored in the first minute to give the USFSA XI an early lead, but Université de Bruxelles scored twice to take a 2–1 first half lead. The French scored five goals in the second half, however, to take the match 6–2.

Final ranking

Medal summary

Medal table

Medalists

See also
List of Olympic medalists in football

References

 
football
1900
1900
1900
Olympics
Olympics
Olympics
Olympics